Kevin Young (born November 17, 1981) is an American basketball coach who is an associate coach for the Phoenix Suns of the National Basketball Association (NBA). He has previously played college basketball and was a head coach for Ireland's Super League with the Shamrock Rovers Hoops and the NBA Development League's Utah Flash, Iowa Energy, and Delaware 87ers. He was also an assistant coach for the Utah Valley State College, Oxford College, and the NBA's Philadelphia 76ers.

Early career
Young's own basketball career started in Marietta, Georgia, where he played high school basketball at Sprayberry High School under Coach Roger Kvam. After high school, Young attended Middle Georgia College, a NJCAA establishment. After 2 years, he transferred to Clayton State University, a Division II university, where he was considered a standout guard there. He is still an all-time leader for field goals, assists and three-point shooting at Clayton State.

Coaching Experience
After finishing his collegiate career, he made his professional head coaching debut at age 23 in Dublin, Ireland with the Shamrock Rovers Hoops in the Super League. Returning to the states after one season, he served as assistant coach at Utah Valley State College, where he helped lead the team to its second most wins in a season. Young also served as an assistant coach for a season at Oxford College of Emory University. After those stints, Young moved on to the NBA D-League, being an assistant coach for the Utah Flash for a season under coach Brad Jones.

In 2010, Young was promoted to head coach of the Utah Flash. In that season, he led the team to a 28–22, including a 9-game winning streak, before losing to the eventual champion Iowa Energy 2–1 in the first round of that series. After Nick Nurse left the Energy, Iowa decided to name Young their new head coach for 2011. Young then coached the Energy for the next two seasons, having an average record the first season and losing in the first round to the Los Angeles D-Fenders, before having a worse record the second season and being subsequently fired after starting with a 6–17 record. Young was then named an assistant coach for the Delaware 87ers, the re-branded team name of the Utah Flash, for a season. He was later meant to be a player development coach for the 87ers before the promotion of head coach Rod Baker to scout for the Philadelphia 76ers lead to Young being promoted back to head coach for the newly re-branded franchise. For the next three seasons, he would see incremental improvements with the 87ers, going from 20 wins to 21 wins to 26 wins throughout his second coaching tenure with the franchise. However, he was also instrumental for not just helping Thanasis Antetokounmpo get drafted in the 2014 NBA draft, but also seeing four different players scoring season-highs of at least 45 points throughout his second season, with Christian Wood and Jordan McRae growing to be capable NBA players in their careers not long after.

On August 4, 2016, Young was promoted to the role of assistant coach for the Philadelphia 76ers. Outside of an injury plagued first season with the 76ers, in each season afterward, he helped get the 76ers into the playoffs for at least the first round, with highlight appearances in the second round for 2018 and 2019. After Brett Brown was fired in 2020, Young interviewed for the open head coach position before it was ultimately filled by Doc Rivers.

On October 9, 2020, Young was named assistant coach for the Phoenix Suns, reuniting with head coach Monty Williams there after a season together as assistant coaches with the 76ers. In his first season with Phoenix, he not only helped the team reach the NBA playoffs for the first time since 2010, but also reach the NBA Finals for the first time since 1993. On August 7, 2021, Young was promoted to the role of associate head coach for the Suns. In his first year as associate head coach, Young became the Suns' acting head coach for a four game stretch in late December/ early January with Monty Williams in health and safety protocols. Following Young's four game stint as acting head coach, Chris Paul said, ""He did a great job...KY will be a head coach very soon in this league." 

In May of 2022, Young was featured in ESPN's annual report on potential coaching candidates to watch. The article stated when talking about Young, "If it's alignment you're looking for, Suns associate head coach Kevin Young is a natural fit. Both the Suns' basketball ops crew and head coach Monty Williams regard Young as an essential hub to share ideas across the organization. It's a logical role for a young coach who excels at both listening and communicating. Young served as a head coach in the G League for six seasons, which gave him a foundation as an organizer and big-picture thinker. He has earned the respect of players with his work ethic and candor. He was a finalist for the Washington job last spring, where his sharpness impressed."

Personal life
Young is married to Melissa Bailey of Omaha, Nebraska and they have two sons and one girl. They were married on July 2, 2011 in the Salt Lake Temple of the Church of Jesus Christ of Latter-day Saints.

References 

Iowa Energy Selects Kevin Young as New Head Coach
Phoenix Suns Adds Kevin Young to Coaching Staff

Living people
1981 births
American expatriate basketball people in Ireland
American Latter Day Saints
American men's basketball coaches
American men's basketball players
Basketball coaches from Georgia (U.S. state)
Basketball coaches from Utah
Basketball players from Georgia (U.S. state)
Basketball players from Salt Lake City
Clayton State Lakers men's basketball players
Delaware 87ers coaches
Iowa Energy coaches
Phoenix Suns assistant coaches
Philadelphia 76ers assistant coaches
Utah Flash coaches
Utah Valley Wolverines men's basketball coaches